Blyth's rosefinch (Carpodacus grandis) or the Himalayan rosefinch, is a species of finch in the family Fringillidae.  It is found in northern Afghanistan to the western Himalayas.  Its natural habitats are temperate forest and boreal shrubland.  It is sometimes considered a subspecies of the red-mantled rosefinch.

The common name commemorates Edward Blyth (1810–1873), English zoologist and Curator of the Museum of the Asiatic Society of Bengal.

References

Clements, J. F., T. S. Schulenberg, M. J. Iliff, B.L. Sullivan, C. L. Wood, and D. Roberson. 2012. The eBird/Clements checklist of birds of the world: Version 6.7. Downloaded from 

Blyth's rosefinch
Birds of Afghanistan
Birds of the Himalayas
Blyth's rosefinch
Blyth's rosefinch